Cheonmasan Station is a railway station of the Gyeongchun Line in Hwado-eup, Namyangju, Gyeonggi, South Korea. The station name comes from Cheonmasan.

Due to approval, the station confirmed, opening date set to June 29, 2013, but the opening was already several months delayed. The station was opened on December 31, 2014.

Station Layout

Gallery

References

External links
 

Metro stations in Namyangju
Seoul Metropolitan Subway stations
Railway stations opened in 2013